This was the first edition of the event.

Květa Peschke and Andrea Petkovic won the title, defeating Caroline Dolehide and CoCo Vandeweghe in the final, 6–3, 6–1. This was Petkovic's first WTA doubles title.

Elise Mertens was in contention to regain the WTA no. 1 doubles ranking by winning the title, but she and partner Hsieh Su-wei withdrew from the competition in the quarterfinals. Barbora Krejčíková accordingly retained the top ranking.

Seeds
The top four seeds received a bye into the second round.

Draw

Finals

Top half

Bottom half

References

External links
Main draw

2021 WTA Tour